The  is a limited express train service in Japan operated by Shikoku Railway Company (JR Shikoku), which runs from  to  and . 

The Ashizuri service was introduced on 21 November 1990.

Route
The main stations served by this service are as follows.

 -  -

Rolling stock
 2000 series 2- 3- or 4-car tilting DMUs (from 1993)

Past rolling stock
 KiHa 181 series DMUs (1990–1993)
 KiHa 185 series DMUs (1990–1993)

History
From 5 March 1966, the name was used for express trains operating.

References

Named passenger trains of Japan
Shikoku Railway Company
Railway services introduced in 1961